Blaž Kavčič was the defending champion. He reached the final but Denis Istomin defeated him 6–3, 1–6, 6–1 and won the title.

Seeds

Draw

Finals

Top half

Bottom half

References
 Main draw
 Qualifying draw

2011 ATP Challenger Tour
Karshi Challenger